Bledar Marashi (born 3 October 1990 in Laç) is an Albanian footballer who most recently played for Besëlidhja Lezhë in the Albanian First Division.

References

External links
 Profile - FSHF

1990 births
Living people
People from Laç
Association football forwards
Albanian footballers
KF Laçi players
KF Adriatiku Mamurrasi players
Besëlidhja Lezhë players
Kategoria Superiore players
Kategoria e Parë players